Linn Grove is an unincorporated community in Hartford Township, Adams County, in the U.S. state of Indiana.

History
The first post office at Linn Grove was established as "Linn" in 1848. It is still currently in operation.

Geography

References

External links

Unincorporated communities in Adams County, Indiana
Unincorporated communities in Indiana